The 2019 Chennai Open Challenger was a professional tennis tournament played on hard courts. It was the second edition of the tournament which was part of the 2019 ATP Challenger Tour. It took place in Chennai, India between 4 and 10 February 2019.

Singles main-draw entrants

Seeds

 1 Rankings are as of 28 January 2019.

Other entrants
The following players received wildcards into the singles main draw:
  Lý Hoàng Nam
  Vijay Sundar Prashanth
  Abhinav Sanjeev Shanmugam
  Manish Sureshkumar
  Siddharth Vishwakarma

The following players received entry into the singles main draw using protected rankings:
  Daniel Altmaier
  Daniel Nguyen

The following player received entry into the singles main draw as an alternate:
  Ivan Gakhov

The following players received entry into the singles main draw using their ITF World Tennis Ranking:
  Moez Echargui
  Ivan Nedelko
  David Pérez Sanz
  Evgenii Tiurnev

The following players received entry from the qualifying draw:
  Kaito Uesugi
  Alexander Zhurbin

Champions

Singles

 Corentin Moutet def.  Andrew Harris 6–3, 6–3.

Doubles

 Gianluca Mager /  Andrea Pellegrino def.  Matt Reid /  Luke Saville 6–4, 7–6(9–7).

References

2019 ATP Challenger Tour
2019 in Indian tennis
February 2019 sports events in India